Reach for Me is the ninth studio album by Australian-born Irish singer and composer Johnny Logan, released in March 2001. It includes Logan re-recording his Eurovision winning tracks "What's Another Year" and "Hold Me Now".

Track listing

Charts

Certifications

References

Johnny Logan (singer) albums
2001 albums